Bilderbuch (English: "Picture Book") is an Austrian rock band and was formed in Kremsmünster, Austria in 2005 but has been based in Vienna since 2008. The current band members are Maurice Ernst (vocals, guitar), Peter Horazdovsky (bass), Michael Krammer (guitar) and Philipp Scheibl (drums). The band has released 7 albums as of 2022. The band began with indie rock, but over the years increasingly adopted elements of hip hop, electronic music and various pop styles.

The band's song "Spliff" was featured in the 2016 Gore Verbinski film A Cure for Wellness.

Discography

Albums 
 Nelken & Schillinge (2009)
 Die Pest im Piemont (2011)
 Schick Schock (2015)
 Magic Life (2017)
 Mea Culpa (2018)
 Vernissage My Heart (2019)
 Gelb ist das Feld (2022)

EPs 
 Bitte, Herr Märtyrer (2010)
 Feinste Seide (2013)

Singles 
 2009: Calypso
 2010: Kopf ab
 2010: Bitte, Herr Märtyrer
 2011: Karibische Träume
 2011: Die Kirschen waren toll
 2012: Ein Boot für uns
 2013: Plansch
 2014: Feinste Seide
 2014: Spliff
 2016: Sweetlove
 2016: I <3 Stress
 2016: Erzähl Deinen Mädels Ich bin wieder in der Stadt
 2018: Checkpoint (Nie Game Over)
 2018: Sandwishes
 2019: LED go
 2019: Europa 22
 2019: Mr. Refrigerator
 2019: Kitsch
 2021: Nahuel Huapi
 2021: Daydrinking

Austrian pop rock music groups
Austrian indie rock groups